A Young Tiger Playing with its Mother is a painting of 1830–31 by French artist Eugène Delacroix depicting two enormous tigers "playing" with each other. Painted early in his career, it shows how the artist was attracted to animal subjects in this period. The painting was exhibited at the Salon of 1831, and archives of Delacroix's will executor, Achille Piron, revealed that the painter had paid 1,200 francs to insure it. It belonged to M. Maurice Cottier and now is on display at Room 77 of Louvre in Paris.

Influence and analysis
Sweetly, the young background tiger slopes in his mother in the foreground, both running into rocks and under a cloudy sky. Some authors have written that Delacroix's animals paintings were made using his pet cat as a model. And although it seems that the painting inspiration is due to one of his visits to the Jardin des Plantes zoo to see the tigers play with his friend Antoine-Louis Barye (an animal sculptor), Delaroix was always more content to observe his own cat.

The piece was in some way influenced by Rubens and is very opposite of Delacroix's violent Tiger Hunt, both (and others Delacroix painting in this subject) capturing the ferocity and tenderness that these animals are capable of. Delacroix could paint two different works that shows a discrepancy of the tigers behavior. In fact, tiger cubs play in their first years of life because it prepares them for hunting, stalking, climbing and fighting in the grown phase. Tigers and great cats are frequent motifs in Eugène's works (see the following section).

These paintings, along with A Young Tiger Playing with its Mother, can be interpreted as a form of the artist displaying human emotions and passions personified as tame and fierce animals. For example, Delacroix wrote in his Journal of the time: "Men are tigers and wolves driven to destroy one another". His friend Théophile Gautier saw a resemblance between him and manner and those of these great cats that he painted, writing: "His tawny eyes, with their feline expression, his slender lips stretched tight over magnificent teeth, his firm jaw line emphasised by strong cheekbones... gave his features an untamed, a strange, exotic, almost alarming beauty."

In French, the picture is called Jeune tigre jouant avec sa mère. Its fierce but also divinely animals represents the "delight in wildness" that Romantic artists like Delacroix was fascinated with. (His interest in wildlife reaches its peak with Ovid among the Scythians (1859) — where there's no feline, but barbarians people.) The painting of the mother and son tigers had a significant history to painter's works and to the time, as Lee Johnson wrote about it:

Other paintings with similar theme

References

External links
 A Young Tiger Playing with its Mother – Olga's Gallery

1831 paintings
Paintings by Eugène Delacroix
Paintings in the Louvre by French artists
Tigers in art